Krasny Voskhod is a rural locality (a settlement) in Ust-Kachkinskoye Rural Settlement, Permsky District, Perm Krai, Russia. The population was 1,364 as of 2010. There are 42 streets.

Geography 
Krasny Voskhod is located 47 km west of Perm (the district's administrative centre) by road. Ust-Kachka is the nearest rural locality.

References 

Rural localities in Permsky District